Player (stylised PLAYER) is the eleventh studio album by the Japanese electronica band Capsule, released on March 3, 2010. The album debuted at the 3rd and 4th position in the Oricon daily and weekly charts respectively, selling 27,549 copies in its first week of release, setting a new high rank for the group. The album sold a total of 47,853 copies and stayed in the charts for ten weeks. Player is Capsule's second highest-selling album in their career, after More! More! More!.

Track listing
Tracks in bold are the album's promotional singles. * indicates vocals from the duo's vocalist, Toshiko Koshijima.

Bonus tracks

References

Links 
 

Capsule (band) albums
2010 albums